Gawler Belt is a locality to the northwest of Gawler in South Australia. The area is predominantly rural in character, although most of the area is now too small allotments to farm profitably, so it is essentially a rural and industrial suburb of Gawler.

Gawler Belt is bounded on its southeast side by the Gawler bypass road and Sturt Highway. It is crossed by the now-unused Roseworthy railway line, but there has never been a station in Gawler Belt. The Gawler Belt Inn stood approximately where the Redbanks Road interchange on the Gawler Bypass is now, however the hotel was closed well before the bypass was built. The Inn operated from 1857 until 1913.

References

1857 establishments in Australia